The Church of St Mary and St Edward is an Anglican parish church in Barrow Gurney, Somerset, England. It was built in the 12th century, but largely rebuilt in the 1880s, and has been designated as a Grade II* listed building.

The church was originally connected to the neighbouring Barrow Gurney Nunnery which became Barrow Court. It was originally built in the 12th century but was virtually rebuilt by Henry Woodyer 1887–90 for Henry Martin Gibbs son of William Gibbs of Tyntesfield.

It has a three-stage west tower surmounted by pinnacles and a spirelet. There is a two bay chancel, with a Cosmati work floor and four bay nave.

In 2013 an appeal was made for funds to help make repairs to the church including redecoration and servicing of the organ, which was largely unchanged since its construction by Vowles of Bristol around 1890.

The parish is part of the benefice of Long Ashton with Barrow Gurney and Flax Bourton within the deanery of Portishead, and the archdeaconry of Bath.

See also
 List of ecclesiastical parishes in the Diocese of Bath and Wells

References

12th-century church buildings in England
Church of England church buildings in North Somerset
Grade II* listed churches in Somerset
Grade II* listed buildings in North Somerset